The 1987–88 NBA season was the Spurs' 12th season in the NBA and 21st season as a franchise. The season saw the team draft future All-Star and 2-time NBA Champion David Robinson with the first pick in the 1987 NBA Draft, but due to his Naval service, he did not join the team until 1989.

Despite inconsistent basketball all year, the Spurs made the playoffs with a low 31–51 record. However, a sweep to the eventual champion Lakers ended the season for the Spurs. Alvin Robertson was selected for the 1988 NBA All-Star Game.

Draft picks

Roster

Regular season

Season standings

z - clinched division title
y - clinched division title
x - clinched playoff spot

Record vs. opponents

Game log

Regular season

|- style="background:#cfc;"
| 2
| November 7
| Dallas
| W 130–106
|
|
|
| HemisFair Arena
| 1–1
|- style="background:#fcc;"
| 3
| November 10, 19877:30 PM CST
| L.A. Lakers
| L 124–133
|
|
|
| HemisFair Arena13,751
| 1–2
|- style="background:#fcc;"
| 6
| November 15, 19879:30 PM CST
| @ L.A. Lakers
| L 130–147
|
|
|
| The Forum17,505
| 2–4
|- style="background:#fcc;"
| 8
| November 20
| @ Denver
| L 142–156
|
|
|
| McNichols Sports Arena
| 3–5
|- style="background:#cfc;"
| 9
| November 21
| Utah
| W 120–119
|
|
|
| HemisFair Arena
| 4–5
|- style="background:#fcc;"
| 12
| November 27, 19876:30 PM CST
| @ Detroit
| L 111–143
|
|
|
| Pontiac Silverdome30,743
| 5–7
|- style="background:#fcc;"
| 13
| November 28
| @ Atlanta
| L 100–124
|
|
|
| The Omni
| 5–8

|- style="background:#cfc;"
| 15
| December 5
| Chicago
| W 110–101
|
|
|
| HemisFair Arena
| 7–8
|- style="background:#cfc;"
| 16
| December 8
| Utah
| W 105–100
|
|
|
| HemisFair Arena
| 8–8
|- style="background:#cfc"
| 20
| December 18
| Denver
| W 133–114
|
|
|
| HemisFair Arena
| 10–20

|- style="background:#fcc;"
| 26
| January 2
| Dallas
| L 109–116
|
|
|
| HemisFair Arena
| 13–13
|- style="background:#fcc;"
| 27
| January 4, 19889:30 PM CST
| @ L.A. Lakers
| L 115–133
|
|
|
| The Forum17,505
| 13–14
|- style="background:#fcc;"
| 31
| January 13
| Atlanta
| L 110–120
|
|
|
| HemisFair Arena
| 14–17
|- style="background:#fcc;"
| 35
| January 22
| @ Utah
| L 106–119
|
|
|
| Salt Palace
| 15–20
|- style="background:#fcc;"
| 37
| January 26
| @ Dallas
| L 111–128
|
|
|
| Reunion Arena
| 16–21

|- style="background:#fcc;"
| 41
| February 4
| Denver
| L 123–129
|
|
|
| HemisFair Arena
| 18–23
|- style="background:#fcc;"
| 42
| February 9
| @ Denver
| L 108–136
|
|
|
| McNichols Sports Arena
| 18–24
|- style="background:#fcc;"
| 43
| February 10
| Boston
| L 120–136
|
|
|
| HemisFair Arena
| 18–25
|- style="background:#fcc;"
| 44
| February 12, 19887:30 PM CST
| L.A. Lakers
| L 132–133
|
|
|
| HemisFair Arena15,770
| 18–26

|- style="background:#fcc;"
| 55
| March 5
| @ Utah
| L 106–125
|
|
|
| Salt Palace
| 22–33
|- style="background:#fcc;"
| 57
| March 9
| @ Boston
| L 118–119
|
|
|
| Boston Garden
| 22–35
|- style="background:#fcc;"
| 59
| March 12
| @ Chicago
| L 92–112
|
|
|
| Chicago Stadium
| 22–37
|- style="background:#cfc;"
| 63
| March 19
| Utah
| W 113–110
|
|
|
| HemisFair Arena
| 24–39
|- style="background:#fcc;"
| 65
| March 22
| @ Denver
| L 109–136
|
|
|
| McNichols Sports Arena
| 24–41
|- style="background:#cfc;"
| 66
| March 25, 19887:30 PM CST
| Detroit
| W 107–106
|
|
|
| HemisFair Arena8,596
| 25–41
|- style="background:#fcc;"
| 67
| March 26
| @ Dallas
| L 112–131
|
|
|
| Reunion Arena
| 25–42

|- style="background:#fcc;"
| 74
| April 8
| Denver
| L 124–129 (OT)
|
|
|
| HemisFair Arena
| 28–46
|- style="background:#fcc;"
| 78
| April 16
| @ Utah
| L 82–107
|
|
|
| Salt Palace
| 30–48
|- style="background:#fcc;"
| 79
| April 19, 19887:30 PM CDT
| L.A. Lakers
| L 126–133
|
|
|
| HemisFair Arena12,456
| 30–49
|- style="background:#fcc;"
| 81
| April 22
| @ Dallas
| L 96–127
|
|
|
| Reunion Arena
| 31–50
|- style="background:#fcc;"
| 82
| April 24
| Dallas
| L 109–119
|
|
|
| HemisFair Arena
| 31–51

Playoffs

|- align="center" bgcolor="#ffcccc"
| 1
| April 29, 19889:30 PM CDT
| @ L.A. Lakers
| L 110–122
| Alvin Robertson (34)
| Anderson, Berry (8)
| Robertson, Brickowski (5)
| The Forum17,505
| 0–1
|- align="center" bgcolor="#ffcccc"
| 2
| May 1, 19889:30 PM CDT
| @ L.A. Lakers
| L 112–130
| Alvin Robertson (28)
| Frank Brickowski (12)
| Alvin Robertson (12)
| The Forum17,505
| 0–2
|- align="center" bgcolor="#ffcccc"
| 3
| May 3, 19887:30 PM CDT
| L.A. Lakers
| L 107–109
| Frank Brickowski (27)
| Greg Anderson (8)
| Alvin Robertson (11)
| HemisFair Arena11,542
| 0–3
|-

Player statistics

Season

Playoffs

Awards and records
Alvin Robertson, NBA All-Defensive Second Team
Cadillac Anderson, NBA All-Rookie Team 1st Team

Transactions

References

See also
1987-88 NBA season

San Antonio Spurs seasons
San Antonio
San Antonio
San Antonio